Mafa is a genus of lace bugs in the family Tingidae. There are about five described species in Mafa.

Species
These five species belong to the genus Mafa:
 Mafa lanceolata Hesse, 1925
 Mafa longa Duarte Rodrigues, 1982
 Mafa tenuicostata Duarte Rodrigues, 1982
 Mafa testacea Duarte Rodrigues, 1977
 Mafa theroni Duarte Rodrigues, 1990

References

Further reading

   
 
 
 
 
 
 
 
 
 
 

Tingidae
Articles created by Qbugbot